Lamara Distin (born 3 March 2000) is a Jamaican high jumper who won the gold medal at the 2022 Commonwealth Games in Birmingham, England.

Early Life 

Destin was born and raised in the Hanover Parish in Jamaica

Secondary/High School 

Destin competed for Hydel High at the Jamaica track and field high school championship known as "Champs"

Post Secondary/University 

She is an NCAA Champion for Texas A&M University and the current Jamaican record holder in high jump.

In 2023, she was named as a Pre-season candidate for the Bowerman award.

References 

2000 births
Living people
Jamaican female high jumpers
Athletes (track and field) at the 2022 Commonwealth Games
Commonwealth Games competitors for Jamaica
21st-century Jamaican women
Commonwealth Games gold medallists for Jamaica
Commonwealth Games medallists in athletics
Medallists at the 2022 Commonwealth Games